The  was promulgated by the Diet of Japan on June 21, 1892, and designated government support for a network of thirty-three railway lines covering most of Japan, with the exception of Hokkaidō. On April 11, 1922, the Diet amended the law to add an additional network of regional and local routes. Today, these lines form the backbone of the national railway network, JR (although JR has relinquished control of some of the more minor ones).

Lines designated by the Act of 1892

Notable main lines before the Act
The lines in following list don't appear the act, because operated already or soon.
Tokyo — Gotenba — Nagoya — Gifu — Maibara — Kusatsu — Kyoto — Osaka — Kōbe (Tōkaidō Main Line)
Tokyo — Hachiōji (Chūō Main Line as Chūō Line Rapid)
Takasaki — Shinonoi — Nagano — Toyono — Naoetsu (Shin’etsu Main Line)
Maibara — Tsuruga (Hokuriku Main Line)
Ōmiya — Takasaki — Maebashi (Takasaki Line)
Tokyo — Ōmiya — Shirakawa — Fukushima — Iwanuma — Sendai — Kogota — Kitakami — Morioka — Aomori (Tōhoku Main Line)
Tokyo — Mito (Jōban Line)
Nagoya — Kameyama — Tsuge — Kusatsu (Kansai Main Line and Kusatsu line)
Osaka — Ōji — Nara (Tōkaidō Main Line and Nara Line)
Ōji — Takada
Kōbe — Himeji — Okayama — Mihara
Marugame — Tadotsu — Kotohira
Moji — Kokura — Hakata — Tosu — Kurume — Ōmuta — Kumamoto
Tosu — Saga
Wakamatsu — Iizuka

See also
Railway Nationalization Act
History of rail transport in Japan

Rail transport in Japan
Japanese legislation
1892 in law
Empire of Japan
1892 in Japan
Railway legislation
Rail regulation
History of rail transport in Japan
1892 in rail transport